Francescuolo da Brossano was the son-in-law and heir of the Italian medieval poet Petrarch.

Biography 
Born in Milan, Francescuolo ("Little Francesco") was named executor of Petrarch's testamentum. He married Petrarch's daughter Francesca in 1361, the same year Giovanni (Petrarch's son) died of the plague. Petrarch moved to Venice in the fall of 1362 and lived there for five years. That same year his daughter Francesca,  with the young nobleman from Milan, came to Venice and lived with the famous poet at Palazzo Molina. This was shortly after the birth of their first child, a daughter named Eletta. A second grandchild was born in 1366 named Francesco that Petrarch adored. This grandchild however died less than 2 years later.

They lived in a house through 1367 on the most popular promenade in Venice at number 4145 "Riva degli Schiavoni" called Palazzo Molina. Later they moved to Padua taking Petrarch's library with them. Petrarch didn't always live with them, but was much pleased with both his daughter and Francescuolo. He was, however, usually in their company. As executor of Petrarch's estate, Francescuolo da Brossano had some correspondence with Coluccio Salutati. Some of Brossano's letters are published in the public letters of Coluccio Salutati.

Jacques-François-Paul-Aldonce de Sade in his book The Life of Petrarch says of Petrarch's closed casket funeral and reburial six years later by Francescuolo da Brossano in 1380, who built a raised sepulcher of red Verona marble with verses placed on top:

An article in The New Century Italian Renaissance Encyclopedia says:

That Francescuolo came from Milan is given by Thomas Campbell in an 1879 English translation of the life of Petrarch: "In the same year, 1361, Petrarch married his daughter Francesca, now near the age of twenty, to Francescuolo di Brossano, a gentleman of Milan"

German historian Theodor Ernst Mommsen notes in his translation of Petrarch's testamentum saying in respect to Francescuolo being a native of Milan:

Notes

References

External links
Timeline of life of Petrarch
Prioject Gutenberg - The Sonnets, Triumphs, and Other Poems of Petrarch by Francesco Petrarca

Nobility from Milan
14th-century Italian nobility
Petrarch